Secrets is the second studio album by American singer Toni Braxton, released on June 18, 1996, by LaFace Records and Arista Records. The album was nominated for Best Pop Album at the 1997 Grammy Awards. Secrets has been certified eight-times platinum by the Recording Industry Association of America (RIAA). Worldwide, the album has sold over 15 million copies. In support of the album, Braxton embarked on the Secrets Tour, playing dates in North America and Europe from August 1996 to October 1997.

Composition
The album's first song "Come On Over Here" is a "finger-poppingly upbeat", sultry groove track produced by Tony Rich. It was described as "a neo-Motown composition". The second track and lead single, the airily funky "You're Makin' Me High", was produced by Babyface and Bryce Wilson. It was also nominated for a Grammy Award for Best R&B Song. The third track "There's No Me Without You" is a romantic song. The fourth track and second single "Un-Break My Heart" is a ballad written by Diane Warren. She played the finished song to Arista Records president Clive Davis, who thought it would be perfect for Braxton. With background vocals by Shanice Wilson and production by David Foster, the song spent 11 weeks at number one on pop radio stations and 14 weeks at number one on adult contemporary radio in late 1996. It also won a Grammy Award for Best Female Pop Vocal Performance in 1997. It is a song of blistering heartbreak, as Braxton sings to her former lover, begging him to return to her and undo all the pain he has caused. The fifth track "Talking in His Sleep" is about adultery.

The sixth track "How Could an Angel Break My Heart" was co-written by Babyface and Braxton and features saxophonist Kenny G. Over a "lulling" ballad melody, the lyrics detail a lover's wayward behavior. "Let It Flow", included on the soundtrack to Waiting to Exhale, eventually became a staple of urban contemporary radio. The song is a sultry tune that requires the singer to reach down to her lowest register. On "Why Should I Care", Braxton ascends to a high, breathy croon, while on "I Don't Want To", R. Kelly provides the soft bump-and-grind sound, in a song about a romance in denial, and "I Love Me Some Him" was written by Andrea Martin and Gloria Stewart and produced by Soulshock & Karlin.

Singles
The album's lead single, "You're Makin' Me High", earned Braxton her first number-one single on both the Billboard Hot 100 and the Billboard Hot R&B/Hip-Hop Songs charts. Its B-side, "Let It Flow", was an airplay success and was featured on the soundtrack to the 1995 film Waiting to Exhale. The second single, "Un-Break My Heart", became a commercial success worldwide, peaking at number one on the Hot 100 for 11 consecutive weeks, number one on the Hot Dance Club Play, and number two on the Hot R&B/Hip-Hop Songs, while topping the charts in several other countries. The third single from the album, "I Don't Want To", reached the top 20 of the Hot 100 and the top 10 of the R&B chart. Its B-side, "I Love Me Some Him", was a major airplay success domestically. The fourth official single, "How Could an Angel Break My Heart", which features Kenny G on the saxophone, became another top-40 entry in the United Kingdom, while failing to enter the charts in the US.

Critical reception

Secrets received generally positive reviews from music critics. Stephen Thomas Erlewine from AllMusic wrote that Braxton's "vocal talent is what unites Secrets and makes it into a first-rate contemporary R&B collection. Braxton is a singer who can cross over into the smooth confines of adult contemporary radio without losing or betraying the soul that lies at the foundation of her music, and her talent burns at its brightest on Secrets." Ken Tucker of Entertainment Weekly praised the "core Braxton/Babyface collaborations" on the album as "diverse, witty, and exquisitely modulated", noting Braxton's "technical range" and "ability to deliver Secrets sermons of sensuality—little gospels of good and bad loving—with unusual eloquence." Robert Christgau, writing in The Village Voice, stated, "The apprentice diva of the debut was modest, composed, virtually anonymous. I'll take the right It Girl anytime—especially one who insists on getting her props." David Fricke from Rolling Stone commented, "As designer champagne 'n' anguish R&B goes, Secrets goes down nice and easy."

Commercial performance
Secrets debuted at number two on the Billboard 200 (behind Metallica's Load) and at number one on the Top R&B/Hip-Hop Albums chart, selling 170,000 copies in its first week. The album was certified eight-times platinum by the Recording Industry Association of America (RIAA) on October 3, 2000, and as of April 2011, it had sold 5,364,000 copies in the United States, according to Nielsen SoundScan. It sold an additional 927,000 copies through BMG Music Club. In Canada, the album peaked at number four on RPMs albums chart, and was certified septuple platinum by the Canadian Recording Industry Association (CRIA) on December 31, 1997, denoting shipments in excess of 700,000 units.

The album debuted at number 54 on the UK Albums Chart for the week ending June 29, 1996, before peaking at number 10 in its 30th week on the chart, on January 25, 1997. On April 1, 1997, the British Phonographic Industry (BPI) certified Secrets double platinum for shipments of over 600,000 copies. In continental Europe, the album topped the charts in Denmark, the Netherlands, Norway, and Switzerland, while reaching the top five in Austria, Belgium, Finland, Germany, and Sweden, and the top 10 in Ireland. In Oceania, the album reached number 11 in both Australia and New Zealand; it has been certified double platinum by the Australian Recording Industry Association (ARIA) and gold by the Recording Industry Association of New Zealand (RIANZ). By May 2010, Secrets had sold 15 million copies worldwide.

Track listing

Notes
  signifies an additional producer
  signifies a remixer
  signifies a remix producer

Personnel
Credits adapted from the liner notes of Secrets.

Musicians

 Toni Braxton – lead vocals, background vocals ; all vocals ; vocal arrangement 
 Tony Rich – arrangement, all instruments, background vocals 
 Marc Nelson – background vocals 
 Shanice Wilson – background vocals 
 Randy Walker – MIDI programming 
 Bryce Wilson – drum programming, keyboard programming 
 Babyface – keyboards ; guitar ; background vocals ; drum programming ; acoustic guitar, electric guitar ; synthesizers 
 Chanté Moore – background vocals 
 Jakkai Butler – background vocals 
 Reggie Hamilton – bass 
 Luis Conte – percussion 
 Jeremy Lubbock – string arrangement, string conducting 
 David Foster – arrangement, keyboard programming 
 Simon Franglen – Synclavier programming 
 Dean Parks – acoustic guitar 
 Michael Thompson – electric guitar ; guitar 
 L.A. Reid – background vocal arrangement 
 Tim Thomas – background vocal arrangement 
 Keith Crouch – arrangement, B3 organ, all other instruments, vocal arrangement 
 Sherree Ford-Payne – background vocals 
 Greg Phillinganes – piano ; Rhodes 
 Nathan East – bass 
 Kenny G – saxophone 
 Reggie Griffin – guitar 
 R. Kelly – arrangement, background vocals, all instruments 
 Soulshock & Karlin – arrangement 
 Andrea Martin – background vocals

Technical

 Tony Rich – production 
 L.A. Reid – production ; executive production
 NealHPogue – recording 
 Leslie Brathwaite – recording 
 John Frye – recording assistance 
 Jon Gass – mixing 
 Babyface – production ; executive production
 Bryce Wilson – production 
 Brad Gilderman – recording 
 Russell Elevado – recording 
 Paul Boutin – recording assistance 
 Robbes Stieglitz – recording assistance 
 Bryan Reminic – recording assistance 
 "Bassy" Bob Brockmann – mixing 
 Kyle Bess – recording assistance 
 Brandon Harris – recording assistance 
 Richard Huredia – recording assistance 
 Ivy Skoff – production coordination 
 David Foster – production 
 Felipe Elgueta – recording 
 Mick Guzauski – mixing 
 Marnie Riley – mixing assistance 
 Keith Crouch – production, recording 
 Eugene Lo – recording 
 Booker T. Jones III – mixing 
 Jin Choi – recording assistance 
 Jon Shrive – recording assistance 
 Bill Kinsley – recording assistance 
 Brad Haehnel – recording assistance 
 Al Schmitt – string engineering 
 Glen Marchese – recording assistance 
 Larry Schalit – recording assistance 
 R. Kelly – production, mixing 
 Peter Mokran – recording, mixing 
 John Merchant – recording assistance 
 Frank Gonzales – recording assistance 
 Ron Lowe – mixing assistance 
 Soulshock & Karlin – production 
 Manny Marroquin – recording 
 Dave Reitzas – string engineering 
 Herb Powers Jr. – mastering
 Toni Braxton – executive production

Artwork
 Toni Braxton – creative direction
 Davett Singletary – art direction
 D.L. Warfield – design
 Nigel Sawyer – design assistance
 Randee St. Nicholas – photography

Charts

Weekly charts

Year-end charts

Decade-end charts

All-time charts

Certifications and sales

Release history

Notes

References

1996 albums
Albums produced by David Foster
Albums produced by R. Kelly
Arista Records albums
LaFace Records albums
Toni Braxton albums